20th Anniversary ~Singles & My Favorites~ is a compilation album by Japanese singer Rina Chinen, released on February 8, 2017, by Sony Music Entertainment Japan to commemorate the 20th anniversary of her music career and celebrate her 36th birthday. The two-disc album compiles Chinen's singles from 1996 to 2001, plus select tracks from her previous releases and two tracks from her stage musical career.

The album peaked at No. 117 on Oricon's albums chart.

Track listing

Charts

References

External links 
 

2017 compilation albums
Japanese-language compilation albums
Sony Music Entertainment Japan compilation albums